Karimabad (also Romanized as Karīmābād) is a village in Paskhan Rural District, in the Central District of Darab County, Fars Province, Iran. At the 2006 census, its population was 499, in 108 families.

References 

Populated places in Darab County